Riffe Lake is a  long reservoir on the Cowlitz River in the U.S. state of Washington. Originally named Mossyrock Lake, then later as Davisson Lake after a utilities commissioner in Tacoma, the lake was renamed in 1976 after the community of Riffe, which was inundated by the lake. The residents of Kosmos and Nesika were also relocated as the lake's water level would submerge all of Nesika and much of Kosmos.

The lake contains species of fish including rainbow and brown trout, landlocked coho, bass both large mouth and small mouth, bluegill, crappie, and perch.

In 2017, Tacoma Power lowered the maximum water level of the lake by  due to concerns that the Mossyrock Dam could fail during a major seismic event and cause catastrophic flooding.

Gallery

See also
 List of lakes in Washington

References

Lakes of Lewis County, Washington
Reservoirs in Washington (state)
Buildings and structures in Lewis County, Washington
Protected areas of Lewis County, Washington
Tacoma Public Utilities